Saint Philip is a civil parish of Antigua and Barbuda, on northeastern Antigua island. It had a population of 3,347 in 2011, which makes it the least populous parish of Antigua and Barbuda.

It is the poorest parish in Antigua and Barbuda, with 25.85% of its population being classified as "poor".

Populated places
The parish contains the city of Freetown. Other populated places include:

 Collins
 Ffryes
 Glanvilles
 Montpelier
 Newfield
 Seatons
 Saint Philips
 Willikies

Demographics
, the population of the parish is 3,322, the lowest population of any parish in the country. There are 1,557 males and 1,765 females.

The following data tables show demographic details for the parish, from the Housing and Population Census of Antigua and Barbuda, undertaken in 2011.

Individual

Household 
There are 1,139 households in Saint Philip Parish.

References

 
Parishes of Antigua and Barbuda
Antigua (island)